Racing After Midnight is the third studio album by Canadian pop metal band Honeymoon Suite, released on March 8, 1988. In 1989 the album was certified Double Platinum in Canada (in excess of 200,000 copies sold). It is also the only Honeymoon Suite album to feature Spoons keyboardist Rob Preuss.

Track listing

Personnel 

Musicians
Johnnie Dee - lead vocals
Dermot "Derry" Grehan - guitars, vocals
Dave Betts - drums
Gary Lalonde - bass
Rob Preuss - keyboards
Bobby LaKind - percussion
Ted Templeman - percussion
Additional personnel 
Michael McDonald - backing vocals on "Long Way Back"
Technical and additional personnel
Ted Templeman - producer
Jeff Hendrickson - engineer, producer
Toby Wright - engineer
Garth Richardson, Chris Steinmetz - assistant engineers
George Marino - mastering
Joan Parker - production coordination
Kim Champagne - art direction, design
Jeri Heiden - art direction
William Coupon - cover photo
Douglas Fraser - logo
Dave Betts - photography
Jim Prue - inlay photography

Charts

Album

Singles

References 

1988 albums
Honeymoon Suite albums
Albums produced by Ted Templeman
Warner Records albums